"Shame on Me" is a song recorded by Canadian country music group The Wilkinsons. It was released in 2000 as the second single from their second studio album, Here and Now. It peaked at number 10 on the RPM Country Tracks chart in August 2000.

Chart performance

References

2000 singles
The Wilkinsons songs
Giant Records (Warner) singles
Songs written by Gary Burr
Song recordings produced by Doug Johnson (record producer)
2000 songs